is a professional Japanese baseball player. He is a pitcher for the Chiba Lotte Marines of Nippon Professional Baseball (NPB).

References 

1998 births
Living people
Baseball people from Tokyo
Nippon Professional Baseball pitchers
Chiba Lotte Marines players